Malcolm Karpany (born 1 June 1995) is a former professional Australian rules footballer who played for the West Coast Eagles in the Australian Football League (AFL). 

He was raised in Adelaide and Moonta, South Australia. He is Indigenous Australian; his family are predominantly Narungga and he is related to Gavin Wanganeen and Michael O'Loughlin. During his high schooling, Malcolm moved to Adelaide and attended Rostrevor College. 
He was drafted by the West Coast Eagles with their second selection and thirty-first overall in the 2013 national draft. He made his debut in the nineteen point loss against  in round 19, 2016 at the Melbourne Cricket Ground. Karpany signed a one-year contract extension at the end of the 2017 season, but was delisted the following year.

References

External links

1995 births
Living people
People educated at Rostrevor College
West Coast Eagles players
Woodville-West Torrens Football Club players
East Perth Football Club players
Australian rules footballers from South Australia
Indigenous Australian players of Australian rules football